Aspect's experiment was the first quantum mechanics experiment to demonstrate the violation of Bell's inequalities. Its 1982 result allowed for further validation of the quantum entanglement and locality principles. It also offered an experimental answer to Albert Einstein, Boris Podolsky, and Nathan Rosen's paradox which had been proposed about fifty years earlier.

The experiment was led by French physicist Alain Aspect at the École supérieure d'optique in Orsay between 1980 and 1982. Its importance was immediately recognized by the scientific community. Although the methodology carried out by Aspect presents a potential flaw, the detection loophole, his result is considered decisive and led to numerous other experiments (the so-called Bell test experiments) which confirmed Aspect's original experiment.

For his work on this topic, Aspect was awarded part of the 2022 Nobel Prize in Physics.

Scientific and historical context 
The experiment must be placed in its historical and scientific context in order to be fully comprehended.

Entanglement, the EPR paradox and Bell inequalities

Quantum entanglement 

Quantum entanglement is a phenomenon first theorized by Erwin Schrödinger in 1935.

Quantum mechanics dictates that once two separate quantum systems (two particles for example) have interacted or if they have a common origin, they cannot be considered as two independent systems. The quantum mechanical formalism postulates that if a first system possesses a  state, and the second a state, then the initial composite system can be represented by the tensor product of both states: . Once the interaction takes place and the two systems become entangled, the new composite state of the system, say , can no longer be written as a tensor product of two separate, individual states. It is a characteristic mark of entanglement that we have a global understanding of the properties of the composite system, and an intrinsic lack of knowledge about the two original separate states. The physical distance between the two systems plays no role in the entangled state (because no position variable is present). The entangled quantum state remains identical — all else being equal — whatever the distances between both systems.

Consequently, any measurement operated on the entangled system is applicable to both elements constituting it: the measure results of both systems are correlated.

The EPR paradox 
The result of the experiment might have shocked Albert Einstein (he died in 1955 long before the experiment was performed) who had a local, realistic outlook on physics. His outlook led him to the conclusion that if the act of measurement influences both systems, then there would exist an influence capable of propagating from one system to the other, at a speed not limited by the speed of light. Quantum mechanical formalism anticipates that the influence of measuring the components of an entangled system has an immediate effect on both components, no matter the distance.

Later in 1935, Albert Einstein, Boris Podolsky, and Nathan Rosen (E.P.R.) imagined a thought experiment which, if one allowed for entangled states to exist, led to a paradox: either some influence travels faster than light (non-causality), or quantum physics is incomplete. None of the two terms of the alternative were admissible at the time, hence the paradox.

This paradox was of great historical importance, but it failed to have an immediate impact. Only Niels Bohr seriously considered the objection it raised, and tried to answer it. But his answer was qualitative, and the paradox remained unsolved. The reality of entanglement remained a matter of opinion, devoid of any direct experimental support. As a matter of fact, the EPR experiment was not practically feasible at the time.

Two major obstacles opposed its undertaking. On one hand, the technical means were insufficient; on the other (and mainly), there seemed to be no effective way of directly measuring the obtained data with quantitative criteria.

The simultaneity of both systems, whatever meaning is attributed to it, could only be observed by comparing two distant measurements, within the constraints of the speed of light. The simultaneity's influence cannot be causal, nor can it transmit information (which amounts to the same thing). This property is therefore compatible with the theory of relativity, according to which no information can travel faster than the speed of light.

Bell inequalities 
In 1964, Irish physicist John Stewart Bell published an article showcasing quantitative and measurable effects of the EPR experiments. Those are the famous Bell inequalities. These inequalities are quantitative relations which must be verified by measuring correlations between systems which fully obey relativist causality. Any violation of these inequalities would allow for instantaneous remote influence.

These inequalities allowed physicists to remove one of the two obstacles preventing the EPR experiments. But in 1964, the available technical means were still insufficient for the experiment's actual undertaking.

First Bell inequalities tests 
The EPR experiments became conceivable in 1969, when an article demonstrated their technical feasibility.

Following this article, the universities of Harvard and Berkeley set up an experimental protocol and led experiments in 1972. The results were contradictory: Harvard observed concordance with the Bell inequalities (and therefore a contradiction with the predictions of quantum physics), whereas Berkeley's results violated Bell's inequalities (and therefore verified quantum physics).

These experiments notably suffered from an unreliable and unproductive source of entangled particles, which required days of continuous experimentation. But constant controlled experimental conditions are extremely difficult to maintain for such long periods of time, especially for experiments as sensitive as this one. Both results were thus questionable.

In 1976, the same experiment was repeated in Houston using a better and more prolific source of entangled photons which allowed the duration of the experiment to be reduced to 80 minutes. In return, the photons were not optimally polarized, thus preventing the Bell inequalities from appearing clearly. The experiment nevertheless revealed a violation of Bell's inequalities, although it was too weak to constitute a definitive answer.

Additionally, and mainly, these experiments were not sufficiently elaborate to overrule the possibility of correlations (which entail the violation of Bell's inequalities) owing to some classical, slower-than-light influence or signal propagating between the two particles.

In the end, the experimental scheme used in these experiments was far removed from the "ideal" scheme which John Bell used to demonstrate his inequalities: there was therefore no certainty that the Bell inequalities could be applied as they were in such experiments.

Aspect's experiments (1980-1982) 
In 1975, since a decisive experiment based on the violation of Bell's inequalities and verifying the veracity of quantum entanglement was still missing, Alain Aspect proposed in an article an experiment meticulous enough to be irrefutable: Proposed experiment to test the non-separability of quantum mechanics.

Alain Aspect specified his experiment so that it would be as decisive as possible. Namely:

 Its source of entangled particles must be excellent to shorten the duration of the experiment and to provide as clear a violation of Bell's inequalities as possible.
 It must show correlations in measurements, but also demonstrate that these correlations are indeed the result of a quantum effect (and consequently of an instantaneous influence) and not of a classical slower-than-light effect between the two particles.
 The experimental scheme must match John Bell's as closely as possible to demonstrate his inequalities so that the agreement between the measured and predicted results be as significant as possible.

Reminder of John Bell's "ideal" scheme 

The illustration above represents the principle scheme from which John Bell demonstrated his inequalities: a source of entangled photons S simultaneously emits two and  photons whose polarization is prepared so that both photons' state vector is:

This formula simply means that the photons are in a superposed state: they are both on a vertical, horizontal or linear polarity with an equal probability.

These two photons are then measured using two polarizers P1 and P2, each with a configurable measuring angle: α and β. the result of each polarizer's measurement can be (+) or (−) according to whether the measured polarization is parallel or perpendicular to the polarizer's angle of measurement.

One noteworthy aspect is that the polarizers imagined for this ideal experiment give a measurable result both in the (−) and (+) situations. Not all real polarizers are able to do this: some detect the (+) situation for example, but are unable to detect anything in the (−) situation (the photon never leaves the polarizer). The first experiments (described above) used the latter sort of polarizer. Alain Aspect's polarizers are much better able to detect both scenarios and therefore much closer to the ideal experiment.

Given the apparatus and the initial state of polarization given to the photons, quantum mechanics is able to predict the probabilities of measuring (+,+), (−,−), (+,−) and (−,+) on the polarizers (P1,P2), oriented on the (α,β) angles. As a reminder:

A maximal violation of Bell's inequalities is predicted for |α−β| = 22.5°

Description of the experimental set-up 
Alain Aspect (with the notable collaboration of physicists Philippe Grangier, Gérard Roger and Jean Dalibard) set up several increasingly complex experiments between 1980 and 1982.

Only his most complex experiment, which took place in 1982 and is the closest to the initial specifications, will be described here.

Photon source 
The first experiments testing Bell's inequalities possessed low-intensity photon sources and necessitated a continuous week to complete. One of Alain Aspect's first improvements consisted in using a photon source several orders of magnitude more efficient. This source allowed a detection rate of 100 photons per second, thus shortening the length of the experiment to 100 seconds.

The source used is a calcium radiative cascade, excited with a krypton laser.

Polarizers with an adjustable orientation variable and on a remote position 
One of the main points of this experiment was to make sure that the correlation between the measurements P1 and P2 had not been the result of "classical" effects, especially experimental artefacts.

As an example, when P1 and P2 are prepared with fixed angles α and β, it can be surmised that this state generates parasitic correlations through current or mass loops, or some other effects. As a matter of fact, both polarizers belong to the same setup and could influence one another through the various circuits of the experimental device, and generate correlations upon measurement.

One can then imagine that the fixed orientation of the polarizers impacts, one way or the other, the state the photon couple is emitted with. In such a case, the correlations between the measurement results could be explained by hidden variables within the photons, upon their emission. Alain Aspects had mentioned these observations to John Bell himself.

One way of ruling out these kinds of effects is to determine the (α,β) orientation of the polarizers at the last moment — after the photons have been emitted, and before their detection — and to keep them far enough from each other to prevent any signal from reaching any one of them.

This method assures that the orientation of the polarizers during the emission has no bearing on the result (since the orientation is yet undetermined during emission). It also assures that the polarizers do not influence each other, being too distant from one another.

As a consequence, Aspect's experimental set-up has polarizers P1 and P2 set 6 metres apart from the source, and 12 metres apart from one another. With this setup, only 20 nanoseconds elapse between the emission of the photons and their detection. During this extremely short period of time, the experimenter has to decide on the polarizers' orientation and to then orient them.

Since it is physically impossible to modify a polarizer's orientation within such a time span, two polarizers — one for each side — were used and pre-oriented in different directions. A high-frequency shunting randomly oriented towards one polarizer or the other. The setup corresponded to one polarizer with a randomly tilting polarization angle.

Since it was not possible either to have the emitted photons provoke the tilting, the polarizers shunted periodically every  10 nanoseconds (asynchronously with the photon's emission) thus assuring the referral device would tilt at least once between the emission of the photon and its detection.

Two-channel polarizers 
Another important characteristic of the 1982 experiment was the use of two-channel polarizers which allowed a measurable result in situations (+) and (−). The polarizers used until Aspect's experiment could detect situation (+), but not situation (−). These single-channel polarizers had two major inconveniences:

 Situation (−) was difficult to discriminate from an experimentation mistake.
 They had to be scrupulously calibrated.

The two-channel polarizers Aspect used in his experiment avoided these two inconveniences and allowed him to use Bell's formulas directly to calculate the inequalities.

Technically, the polarizers he used were polarizing cubes which transmitted one polarity and reflected the other one, emulating a Stern-Gerlach device.

Experiment results 
Bell's inequalities establish a theoretical curve of the number of correlations (++ or −−) between the two detectors in relation to the relative angle of the detectors . The shape of the curve is characteristic of the violation of Bell's inequalities. The measures' matching the shape of the curve establishes, quantitatively and qualitatively, that Bell's inequalities have been violated.

Aspect's experiments unambiguously confirmed the violation, as predicted the Copenhagen interpretation of quantum physics, thus undermining Einstein's local realistic outlook on quantum mechanics and local hidden variable scenarios. In addition to being confirmed, the violation was confirmed in the exact way predicted by quantum mechanics, with a statistical agreement of up to 242 standard deviation.

Given the technical quality of the experiment, the scrupulous avoidance of experimental artefacts, and the quasi-perfect statistical agreement, this experiment convinced the scientific community at large that quantum physics violated Bell's inequalities and, consequently, that quantum physics was non-local.

Limits of the experiment 
After the results, some physicists legitimately tried to look for flaws in Aspect's experiment and to find out how to improve it to resist criticism.

Some theoretical objections can be raised against the setup:

 the quasi-periodical aspect of the shunting oscillations hinders the validity of the experiment because it can induce correlations through quasi-synchronization resulting from two referrals;
 the correlations (+,+), (−,−) etc. were counted in real time, at the moment of detection. Each polarizer's two (+) and (−) channels were therefore linked by physical circuits. Once more, correlations may be induced.

The ideal experiment, which would negate any imaginable possibility of induced correlations should:

 use purely random shunting;
 record the (+) or (−) results on each side of the device, without any physical link between the two sides. The correlations would be calculated after the experiment, by comparing the recorded results of both sides.

The conditions of the experiment also suffered from a detection loophole.

Recent experiments 
The loopholes mentioned could only be solved from 1998. In the meantime, Aspect's experiment was reproduced, and the violation of Bell's inequalities was systematically confirmed, with a statistical certainty of up to 100 standard deviation.

Other experiments were conducted to test the violations of Bell's inequalities with other observables than polarization, in order to approach the original spirit of the EPR paradox, in which Einstein imagined measuring two combined variables (such as position and movement quantity) on an EPR pair. An experiment introduced the combined variables (time and energy) which, once again, confirmed quantum mechanics.

In 1998, the Geneva experiment tested the correlation between two detectors set 30 kilometres apart using the Swiss optical fibre telecommunication network. The distance gave more time to commute the angles of the polarizers. It was therefore possible to have a completely random shunting. Additionally, the two distant polarizers were entirely independent. The measurements were recorded on each side, and compared after the experiment by dating each measurement using an atomic clock. The violation of Bell's inequalities was once again verified under strict and practically ideal conditions. If Aspect's experiment implied that a hypothetical coordination signal travel twice as fast as c, Geneva's reached 10 million times c.

An experiment took place in Boulder in 2000 on trapped-ion entanglement using a very efficient correlation-based detection method. The reliability of detection proved to be sufficient for the experiment to violate Bell's inequalities on the whole, even though all detected correlations did not violate them.

In 2001, Antoine Suarez's team, which included Nicolas Gisin who had participated in the Geneva experiment, reproduced the experiment using mirrors or detectors in motion, allowing them to reverse the order of events across the frames of reference, in accordance with special relativity (this inversion is only possible for events without any causal relationship). The speeds are chosen so that when a photon is reflected or crosses the semi-transparent mirror, the other photon has already crossed or been reflected from the point of view of the frame of reference attached to the mirror. This an "after-after" configuration, in which sound waves play the role of semi-transparent mirrors.

Another tested configuration allows for each photon to be received by a moving detector so that in that detector's frame of reference, the other photon has not been detected yet, whether it has crossed or been reflected or not ("before-before" configuration). Bell's inequalities are violated in this experiment notably.

Since 2015, quantum physics' violation of Bell's inequalities has been clearly established. Quantum nonlocality and entanglement must therefore be recognized.

Relativistic causality 
The question of whether Aspect's experiment challenges relativistic causality is raised by the widespread conception that "a quantum object presents a state which instantaneously depends on the state of another object with which it has been entangled." This "non-local influence" introduction is often used in popular science journals but also (deliberately) by some scientists who adhere to realism, such as Alain Aspect himself, or Bernard d'Espagnat.

Three possibilities then subsist:

 The first is that experimenters should only use calculations with results in accordance with the experiment, without referring to an explanation derived from our "macroscopic" logic. This approach, borrowed from the Copenhagen interpretation, is the most widely recognized among physicists. It is based on the fact that no explanation of the EPR phenomena leads to verifications or measurable predictions. As a consequence, most physicists consider this experiment's explanations to fall outside the field of science (see Karl Popper's criterion of falsification). Most explanations indeed lack theoretical formalization, and those which do not, fail to suggest measurable verifications. An empirical approach is therefore at play here, and it aims at avoiding any slide outside the scientific field. In their work The Undivided Universe: An Ontological Interpretation of Quantum Theory, physicists David Bohm and Basil Hiley consider objections to the non-locality principle to be baseless. In answer to those who regard the acceptation of non-locality as an obstacle to the scientific isolation and observation of any given object, Bohm and Hiley argue that, in the macroscopic world, this science is possible since the effects of non-locality are not significant: interpretation allows for exactly the same degree of system separability as what is required of "actual scientific work." To match the theory of special relativity with non-locality (see EPR paradox) is a more complex matter, but Bohm, like John Stewart Bell, points out that the transmission of signals is not what is at play in the notion of non-locality.

Bohm and Hiley, like Bell, see extra-scientific factors in the rejection of non-locality:

 The second possibility is that entanglement "unified" the two objects submitted to an interaction: the two objects remain "one" despite their spatial distance ("Bernard d'Espagnat's non-locality"). This distancing can, in actuality, even be temporal: it is fundamentally spatio-temporal. As of yet, no explanation exists for what is considered as an experiment result rather than an explanation or an interpretation of this result. This approach which aims at explaining experiment facts is that of the rationalists.
 The third one consists in changing our conception of causality and in accepting the principle of a retrograde causality (a causal flow from the future to the past), which cannot however be assimilated to the classical philosophers' "teleological" " final cause." No one is there to orient events according to an objective: the nature of backward causation is identical to causality as we conceive it ("efficient causality" of the classical philosophers), except it flows backwards in relation to time and may "add" itself to "classical" causality. This interpretation requires for the irreversible nature of time to be only true on a macroscopic scale (second law of thermodynamics). Numerous physicists are opposed to the idea, such as physicist and philosopher Étienne Klein who points out that the arrow of time is, according to him, inscribed in the symmetries of particle physics. This interpretation has some success among those who develop esoteric interpretations of the experiment, and use it to make parapsychological phenomena (controversial in the scientific community, notably precognition. Olivier Costa de Beauregard is famous for his defence of such theses.) But this interpretation blatantly contradicts the experiment's results as they were most often conducted: the world line linking the "P1 measurement" and "P2 measurement" events of spacetime is a curvature of space. As a matter of fact, in order to disprove a possible alternative interpretation of the correlations observed in these experiments, the experimenters had to show that relativist "causality" was at least partly unable to explain these results, included with scenarios such as: "the photon  informs, by whatever relativistic process, the photon  of its quantum state after the first measurement... ." It is however perfectly clear that the experimenters' precautions to remove all relativistic "causal" explanations remove at the same time, according to the prevailing view, any "retro-causal" explanation. Finally, for the followers of the leading conception, this type of conception is a conjectural interpretation and does not really refer to the existing experiments. In their opinion, it leads to interpretations at the frontier of science, or even pseudoscience, and involves quantum physics in a debate where it does not belong.

No physicist believes the results of the EPR experiment in general and of Aspect's experiment in particular—in perfect agreement with the Copenhagen interpretation of quantum mechanics—challenge, in any way whatsoever, the relativity principle according to which no form of energy (matter or force), and therefore no usable information, can travel faster than the speed of light nor does it, as a consequence, challenge the derived relativist causality principle. It can easily be proven that quantum entanglement cannot be used to instantaneously transmit information from one space-time point to the other. The results measured on the first particle are random; the state alterations on the other particle induced by these measurements—as instantaneous as they may be according to the Copenhagen interpretation of quantum mechanics and Aspect's experiment's results—lead to measurement results relative to the second particle which are seemingly just as random: no usable information can be separately obtained upon measuring, and the correlations remain undetectable as long as the two series' results are not compared. This kind of experiment demonstrates the unavoidable need for a "classical" signal in the relativistic sense in order to transmit the information necessary for the detection of these correlations. Without this signal, nothing can be transmitted. It determines the speed of the transmission of information which reaffirms the fundamental principle of relativity. As a result, the relativist causality principle is perfectly compatible with the EPR experiments results.

See also 
 Superdeterminism

Footnotes

References

Bibliography 
 Bernard d'Espagnat, Traité de physique et de philosophie, Fayard  (in French). See chapter 3. Non-separability and Bell theorem.
 Bernard d'Espagnat, À la recherche du réel, Bordas  (in French).
 Bernard d'Espagnat, Étienne Klein, Regards sur la matière  (in French). See chapter VIII. Non-separability of correlating couples.

External links 

 Video conference on quantum optics (17 min), by Alain Aspect, head of research at the Institut d'Optique in Orsay (in French).
 Centre for Quantum Philosophy

Thought experiments in quantum mechanics
Quantum measurement